The men's 10K (10 kilometer) race at the 2009 World Championships occurred on Wednesday, July 22 at Ostia Beach in Rome, Italy. In total, 48 males from 27 countries were entered in the race.

Results

Key: DNF = Did not finish, DQ = Disqualified

Protest over finish
Due to a protest about the race finish, results from the race were delayed a day, until after a meeting on Thursday, July 23, 2009. At issue was the USA's Fran Crippen's finish approach.

On July 23, 2009, it was decided that Crippen's finish approach was legal and he was awarded the bronze medal.

See also
Open water swimming at the 2007 World Aquatics Championships – Men's 10 km
Swimming at the 2008 Summer Olympics

References

World Aquatics Championships
Open water swimming at the 2009 World Aquatics Championships